Blackhawk Airfield  is a privately owned public use airport in Dane County, Wisconsin, United States. It is located 10 nautical miles (12 mi, 19 km) east of the central business district of Madison, near the village of Cottage Grove. This airport was included in the National Plan of Integrated Airport Systems for 2011–2015, which categorized it as a general aviation facility, but is not listed in the 2021–2025 NPIAS.

Facilities and aircraft 
Blackhawk Airfield covers an area of 27 acres (11 ha) at an elevation of 920 feet (280 m) above mean sea level. It has two runways with asphalt surfaces: 4/22 is 2,814 by 57 feet (858 x 17 m) and 9/27 is 2,203 by 56 feet (671 x 17 m).

For the 12-month period ending July 22, 2022, the airport had 2,000 aircraft operations, an average of 38 operations per week: 50% transient general aviation and 50% local general aviation. In January 2023, there were 34 aircraft based at this airport: all 34 single-engine.

See also 
 List of airports in Wisconsin

References

External links 
 Blackhawk Airfield (87Y) at Wisconsin DOT Airport Directory
 

Airports in Wisconsin
Transportation in Dane County, Wisconsin